Jadranko Bogičević (born 11 March 1983) is a Bosnian football manager and former player who is currently working as an assistant manager at Bosnian Premier League club Željezničar.

Club career
After starting in Jedinstvo Brčko, Bogičević made a great move to Serbian club Red Star Belgrade, where he stayed for two seasons, but he didn't got many chance, with only 2 appearances in the 2003–04 First League of Serbia and Montenegro season and none in the following season.

Afterwards, he returned to Bosnia, and played first in Borac Banja Luka, before moving to Modriča in 2007. He won his first league title with Modriča in the 2007–08 season. In January 2010, Bogičević signed with Željezničar, then moved to Ironi Nir Ramat HaSharon in 2013, and subsequently signed with Olimpik.

In 2016, Bogičević came back to Željezničar, the club that he had the most success with. On 29 October 2018, it was announced that he, alongside former teammate Jovan Blagojević was not counted on the remaining games until the winter break of the season. Reasons for that decision of the club's board of directors and Željezničar's manager at that time, Milomir Odović are to this day completely unknown.

On 31 January 2019, Bogičević extended his contract with Željezničar, which was due to keep him at the club until January 2020. He left the club on 20 January 2020 after his contract expired.

Shortly after leaving Željezničar, Bogičević joined Slavija Sarajevo in January 2020. Bogičević finished his career in January 2021.

International career
Bogičević was part of the Bosnia and Herzegovina U21 national team in 2005.

Honours
Jedinstvo Brčko 
Republika Srpska Cup: 2002–03

Red Star Belgrade 
Serbia and Montenegro League: 2003–04
Serbia and Montenegro Cup: 2003–04 

Borac Banja Luka 
First League of RS: 2005–06

Modriča 
Bosnian Premier League: 2007–08

Željezničar 
Bosnian Premier League: 2011–12, 2012–13
Bosnian Cup: 2010–11, 2011–12, 2017–18

Olimpik 
Bosnian Cup: 2014–15

References

External links
 

Profile and stats until 2003 at Dekisa.Tripod

1983 births
Living people
People from Vlasenica
Serbs of Bosnia and Herzegovina
Association football central defenders
Bosnia and Herzegovina footballers
Bosnia and Herzegovina youth international footballers
Bosnia and Herzegovina under-21 international footballers
FK Jedinstvo Brčko players
Red Star Belgrade footballers
FK Borac Banja Luka players
FK Modriča players
FK Željezničar Sarajevo players
Hapoel Nir Ramat HaSharon F.C. players
FK Olimpik players
FK Slavija Sarajevo players
First League of the Republika Srpska players
First League of Serbia and Montenegro players
Premier League of Bosnia and Herzegovina players
Israeli Premier League players
Bosnia and Herzegovina expatriate footballers
Expatriate footballers in Serbia and Montenegro
Bosnia and Herzegovina expatriate sportspeople in Serbia and Montenegro
Expatriate footballers in Israel
Bosnia and Herzegovina expatriate sportspeople in Israel